The 2019 La Flèche Wallonne is a road cycling one-day race that took place on 24 April 2019 in Belgium. It was the 83rd edition of La Flèche Wallonne and the 19th event of the 2019 UCI World Tour. It was won for the second consecutive time by Julian Alaphilippe.

Teams
As La Flèche Wallonne was a UCI World Tour event, all eighteen UCI WorldTeams were invited automatically and obliged to enter a team in the race. Seven UCI Professional Continental teams competed, completing the 25-team peloton.

Result

References

La Fleche Wallonne
La Fleche Wallonne
La Fleche Wallonne
La Flèche Wallonne